
Gmina Tuczno is an urban-rural gmina (administrative district) in Wałcz County, West Pomeranian Voivodeship, in north-western Poland.

Villages
Apart from the town of Tuczno, Gmina Tuczno contains the villages and settlements of Bytyń, Jamienko, Jeziorki, Krępa Krajeńska, Lubiesz, Lubowo, Mączno, Marcinkowice, Martew, Miłogoszcz, Nowa Studnica, Płociczno, Ponikiew, Próchnówko, Rusinowo, Rzeczyca, Strzaliny, Tuczno Drugie, Tuczno Pierwsze, Tuczno Trzecie, Wrzosy, Zdbowo and Złotowo.

Neighbouring gminas
Gmina Tuczno is bordered by the gminas of Człopa, Drawno, Kalisz Pomorski, Mirosławiec and Wałcz.

References
Polish official population figures 2006

Tuczno
Wałcz County